Caraway, also known as meridian fennel and Persian cumin (Carum carvi), is a biennial plant in the family Apiaceae, native to western Asia, Europe, and North Africa.

Etymology 
The etymology of "caraway" is unclear. English use of the term caraway dates to at least 1440, possibly having Arabic origin.

Description
The plant is similar in appearance to other members of the carrot family, with finely divided, feathery leaves with thread-like divisions, growing on  stems.

It flowers in June and July.

History 
Caraway was mentioned by the early Greek botanist Pedanius Dioscorides as a herb and tonic. It was later mentioned in the Roman Apicius as an ingredient in recipes. Caraway was known in the Arab world as karauya, and cultivated in Morocco.

Cultivation 

The only species that is cultivated is Carum carvi, its fruits being used in many ways in cooking and in the preparation of medicinal products and liqueurs. 

The plant prefers warm, sunny locations and well-drained soil rich in organic matter.  In warmer regions, it is planted in the winter as an annual.  In temperate climates, it is planted as a summer annual or biennial. 

It is widely established as a cultivated plant. The Netherlands, Poland and Germany are the top caraway producers.  Finland supplies about 28% (2011) of the world's caraway production from some 1500 farms, the high output occurring possibly from its favorable climate and latitudes, which ensure long summer hours of sunlight.

Nutrition
Caraway seeds are 10% water, 50% carbohydrates, 20% protein, and 15% fat (table). In a  reference amount, caraway seeds are a rich source (20% or more of the Daily Value, DV) of protein, B vitamins (24–33% DV), vitamin C (25% DV), and several dietary minerals, especially iron (125% DV), phosphorus (81% DV), and zinc (58% DV) (table).

Phytochemicals 
When ground, caraway seeds yield up to 7.5% of volatile oil, mostly D-carvone, and 15% fixed oil of which the major fatty acids are oleic, linoleic, petroselinic, and palmitic acids.

Phytochemicals identified in caraway seed oil include thymol, o-cymene, γ‑terpinene, trimethylene dichloride, β-pinene, 2-(1-cyclohexenyl), cyclohexanone, β-phellandrene, 3-carene, α-thujene, and linalool.

Uses 
The fruits, usually used whole, have a pungent, anise-like flavor and aroma that comes from essential oils, mostly carvone, limonene, and anethole. Caraway is used as a spice in breads, especially rye bread. In the United States, the most common use of caraway is whole as an addition to rye bread – often called seeded rye or Jewish rye bread, where the recipe itself owes to East Slavic coriander and caraway flavoured rye bread (see Borodinsky bread). Caraway seeds are often used in Irish soda bread and other baked goods.

Caraway may be used in desserts, liquors, casseroles, and other foods. Its leaves can be added to salads, stews, and soups, and are sometimes consumed as herbs, either raw, dried, or cooked, similar to parsley. The root is consumed as a winter root vegetable in some places, similar to parsnips.

Caraway fruits are found in diverse European cuisines and dishes, for example sauerkraut, and the United Kingdom's caraway seed cake. 
In Austrian cuisine it is used to season beef and, in German cuisine, pork. In Hungarian cuisine it is added to goulash, and in Norwegian cuisine and Swedish cuisine it is used for making caraway black bread. In Latvian cuisine whole caraway seeds are added to the Jāņi sour milk cheese.

Caraway oil is used to for the production of Kümmel liquor in Germany and Russia, Scandinavian akvavit, Icelandic brennivín.

Caraway can also be infused in a variety of cheeses such as havarti and bondost to add flavor. 

In Oxford, where the plant appeared to have become naturalised in a meadow, the seeds were formerly offered on a tray by publicans to people who wished to disguise the odour of their drinker's breath.

References

External links 

Carum
Edible Apiaceae
Flora of Europe
Flora of North Africa
Flora of Western Asia
Root vegetables
Spices
Medicinal plants of Africa
Medicinal plants of Asia
Medicinal plants of Europe
Plants described in 1753
Taxa named by Carl Linnaeus